This is a list of the National Register of Historic Places listings in Austin County, Texas.

This is intended to be a complete list of properties and districts listed on the National Register of Historic Places in Austin County, Texas. There are one district and seven individual properties listed on the National Register in the county. Four individually listed properties are also Recorded Texas Historic Landmarks.

Current listings

The publicly disclosed locations of National Register properties and districts may be seen in a mapping service provided.

|}

See also

National Register of Historic Places listings in Texas
Recorded Texas Historic Landmarks in Austin County

References

External links

Austin County, Texas
Austin County
Buildings and structures in Austin County, Texas